Sir John Mills  (born Lewis Ernest Watts Mills; 22 February 190823 April 2005) was an English actor who appeared in more than 120 films in a career spanning seven decades. He excelled on camera as an appealing British everyman who often portrayed guileless, wounded war heroes. In 1971, he received the Academy Award for Best Supporting Actor for his performance in Ryan's Daughter.

For his work in film Mills was knighted by Elizabeth II in 1976. In 2002, he received a BAFTA Fellowship from the British Academy of Film and Television Arts and was named a Disney Legend by The Walt Disney Company.

Early life
John Mills was born on 22 February 1908 in North Elmham, Norfolk, the son of Edith Mills (née Baker), a theatre box office manager, and Lewis Mills, a mathematics teacher.
Mills was born at Watts Naval School, where his father was a master.
He spent his early years in the village of Belton where his father was the headmaster of the village school. He first felt the thrill of performing at a concert in the school hall when he was six years old.
He then lived in a modest house on Gainsborough Road, Felixstowe, Suffolk until 1929. His elder sister was Annette Mills, remembered as presenter of BBC Television's Muffin the Mule (1946–55).

He was educated at Balham Grammar School in London, Sir John Leman High School in Beccles and Norwich High School for Boys, where it is said that his initials can still be seen carved into the brickwork on the side of the building in Upper St Giles Street. Upon leaving school he worked as a clerk at a corn merchant's in Ipswich before finding employment in London as a commercial traveller for the Sanitas Disinfectant Company.

Military service
In September 1939, at the start of the Second World War, Mills enlisted in the British Army, joining the Royal Engineers. He was later commissioned as a Second Lieutenant, but in 1942 he received a medical discharge because of a stomach ulcer.

Career

Early career
Mills took an early interest in acting, making his professional début at the London Hippodrome in The Five O'Clock Girl in 1929. He followed this with a cabaret act.

Mills then got a job with a theatrical company that toured India, China and the Far East performing a number of plays. Noël Coward saw him appear in a production of Journey's End in Singapore and wrote Mills a letter of introduction to use back in London.

On his return Mills starred in The 1931 Revue, Coward's Cavalcade (1931) and the Noël Coward revue Words and Music (1932).

Early films
He made his film debut in The Midshipmaid (1932). He also appeared in The Ghost Camera (1933) with Ida Lupino and Britannia of Billingsgate (1934).

Mills was promoted to leading roles in A Political Party (1934), a comedy. He was in a series of quota quickies: The River Wolves (1934); Those Were the Days (1934), the first film of Will Hay; The Lash (1934); Blind Justice (1934); Doctor's Orders (1934); and Car of Dreams (1935). He did Jill Darling (1934) on stage and was one of many names in Royal Cavalcade (1935).

"A" movies
Mills had the star role in an A film, Brown on Resolution (1935). It was back to quota quickies for Charing Cross Road (1935) and The First Offence (1936). He had another excellent part in an "A", playing Lord Guildford Dudley in Tudor Rose (1936). He did Aren't Men Beasts? (1936) on stage and worked for Hollywood director Raoul Walsh in O.H.M.S. (1937).

Mills starred in The Green Cockatoo (1937) directed by William Cameron Menzies. He appeared as Colley in the hugely popular 1939 film version of Goodbye, Mr Chips, opposite Robert Donat.

World War II
At the Old Vic he was in A Midsummer Night's Dream (1939), She Stoops to Conquer (1939) and Of Mice and Men (1939–40). He joined the army in 1939 but occasionally made films on leave. He went back to movies with Old Bill and Son (1940) and made Cottage to Let (1941), a war film for Anthony Asquith. Mills went back to supporting Will Hay in The Black Sheep of Whitehall (1942) and he was one of many names in the war film, The Big Blockade (1942).

He was in Men in Shadow (1942) on stage, written by his wife. He achieved acclaim for his performance as an able seaman in Noël Coward's In Which We Serve (1942), a huge hit. Mills had another good support role in The Young Mr. Pitt (1942) playing William Wilberforce opposite Robert Donat. He was invalided out of the army in 1942.

Stardom
Mills's climb to stardom began when he had the lead role in We Dive at Dawn (1943), a film directed by Asquith about submariners. He was top billed in This Happy Breed (1944), directed by David Lean and adapted from a Noël Coward play.

Also popular was Waterloo Road (1945), from Sidney Gilliat, in which Mills played a man who goes AWOL to retrieve his wife from a draft-dodger (played by Stewart Granger). Mills played a pilot in The Way to the Stars (1945), directed by Asquith from a script by Terence Rattigan, and another big hit in Britain. He did Duet for Two Hands (1945) on stage.

Mills had his greatest success to date as Pip in Great Expectations (1946), directed by David Lean. It was the third biggest hit at the British box office that year and Mills was voted the sixth most popular star.

Less successful critically and financially was So Well Remembered (1947) which used American writers and directors. The October Man (1947) was a mildly popular thriller from Roy Ward Baker.

Mills played the title role in Scott of the Antarctic (1948), a biopic of Captain Scott. It was the fourth most watched film of the year in Britain and Mills was the eighth biggest star.

Producer
Mills turned producer with The History of Mr Polly (1949) from the novel by H. G. Wells. It was directed by Anthony Pelissier and Mills said it was his favorite film. Pelisse also made The Rocking Horse Winner (1949) which Mills produced; he also played a small role. More liked at the box office was a submarine drama, Morning Departure (1950), directed by Baker. By this stage his fee was a reported £20,000 a film.

Career slump
After Morning Departure Mills took almost two years off. The films he made on his return were not popular: a thriller, Mr Denning Drives North (1951); The Gentle Gunman (1952), where he and Dirk Bogarde played IRA gunmen for Basil Dearden; The Long Memory (1953), a thriller from Robert Hamer.

Popularity revival

Mills had his first hit in a number of years with Hobson's Choice (1954), directed by Lean. He appeared in the war film The Colditz Story (1955).

Mills played a supporting role in a movie for MGM, The End of the Affair (1955), with Deborah Kerr and Van Johnson. More liked in Britain was another war story, Above Us the Waves (1955); this was sixth most popular film at the British box office that year, and helped Mills become the fifth most popular star in the country.

After Escapade (1955), Mills made the popular military comedy The Baby and the Battleship (1956), one of the biggest hits of 1956. Also on that list was another Mills comedy, It's Great to Be Young (1956).

Mills had a key support role as a peasant in War and Peace (1956) and made a cameo in Around the World in 80 Days (1956).

Mills appeared in the thrillers: Town on Trial (1957) directed by John Guillermin and The Vicious Circle (1957). More popular with the public were the war films: Dunkirk (1958), the second most popular film of the year in Britain; Ice Cold in Alex (1958), directed by J. Lee Thompson; and I Was Monty's Double'''(1958), directed by Guillermin.

In the 1959 crime drama Tiger Bay, directed by Thompson, Mills played a police detective investigating a murder that a young girl has witnessed. His daughter Hayley was cast, and earned excellent reviews.

Mills went to Australia to play a cane cutter in the Hollywood financed Summer of the Seventeenth Doll (1959).

Better received was Tunes of Glory (1960), a military drama directed by Ronald Neame co-starring Alec Guinness. Mills's performance earned him a Best Actor Award at the Venice Film Festival.

Walt Disney saw Tiger Bay and offered Hayley Mills the lead role in Pollyanna (1960). Disney also offered John Mills the lead in the adventure film Swiss Family Robinson (1960), which was a huge hit. He did Ross (1960–61) on stage.

The Rank Organisation insisted Mills play the role of the priest in The Singer Not the Song (1961) opposite Dirk Bogarde. Mills and Baker reteamed on an interracial drama Flame in the Streets (1961) and an Italian-British war film The Valiant (1962).

Mills did a comedy with James Mason, Tiara Tahiti (1962). He had a support role in The Chalk Garden (1964) starring Hayley.

After a cameo on the war film Operation Crossbow (1965), Mills made a third film with his daughter, The Truth About Spring (1965). He had a cameo in King Rat (1965) for Bryan Forbes, who then directed Mills in The Wrong Box (1966). Mills played Hayley's father-in-law on screen in The Family Way (1966). He then directed her in Sky West and Crooked (1966) from a script written by his wife.

He was the subject of This Is Your Life on two occasions, firstly in 1960 when he was surprised by Eamonn Andrews outside Pinewood Studios, and again in 1983 when Eamonn surprised him on the stage of London's Wyndham's Theatre at the curtain call of the play Little Lies.

Character actor
Mills began to move into character roles, supporting Hugh O'Brian in Africa Texas Style (1967) and Rod Taylor in Chuka (1967). He went to Italy for a giallo, A Black Veil for Lisa (1968) and played William Hamilton in Emma Hamilton (1968).

Mills had a cameo in Oh! What a Lovely War (1969) for director Richard Attenborough and supported Mark Lester (though he was top billed) in Run Wild, Run Free (1969). He went to Australia to star in a convict drama, Adam's Woman (1970).
 
For his role as the village idiot in Ryan's Daughter (1970) — a complete departure from his usual style – Mills won a Best Supporting Actor Oscar.

He was in Dulcima (1971) then had support roles in Young Winston (1972) for Attenborough, Lady Caroline Lamb (1972), and Oklahoma Crude (1973). On stage he did Veterans at the Royal Court, At the End of the Day (1973), The Good Companions (1974), Great Expectations (1975) and Separate Tables (1977).

Also on the small screen, in 1974 he starred as Captain Tommy "The Elephant" Devon in the six-part television drama series The Zoo Gang, about a group of former underground freedom fighters from World War II, with Brian Keith, Lilli Palmer and Barry Morse.

In the late 1970s Mills could still get lead roles in films, as shown by The "Human" Factor (1975), Trial by Combat (1976), and The Devil's Advocate (1977). He had filmed supporting roles in The Big Sleep (1978) and The Thirty Nine Steps (1978).

His most famous television role was probably as the title character in Quatermass for ITV in 1979. He followed this with a sitcom in Young at Heart (1980–82).

On the big screen he was now mainly playing upper crust types as in Zulu Dawn (1979), Gandhi (1982), and Sahara (1983). He performed Goodbye Mr Chips on stage (1982) followed by Little Lies (1983).

Later career

In 1986 he did The Petition at the National and the following year did Pygmalion on Broadway. He provided a voice for When the Wind Blows (1986) and supported Madonna in Who's That Girl (1987). His best roles were on TV in Harnessing Peacocks (1993) and Martin Chuzzlewit (1994). Mills also starred as Gus: The Theatre Cat in the filmed version of the musical Cats in 1998.

In 2000, Mills released his extensive home cine-film footage in a documentary film entitled Sir John Mills's Moving Memories, with interviews with Mills, his children Hayley, Juliet and Jonathan and Richard Attenborough. The film was produced and written by Jonathan Mills, directed and edited by Marcus Dillistone, and features behind the scenes footage and stories from films such as Ice Cold in Alex and Dunkirk. In addition the film also includes home footage of many of Mills's friends and fellow cast members including Laurence Olivier, Harry Andrews, Walt Disney, David Niven, Dirk Bogarde, Rex Harrison and Tyrone Power. He portrayed a charming old gent as head of an art museum in the 1997 Mr. Bean. Mills's last cinema appearance was playing a tramp in Lights 2 (directed by Marcus Dillistone); the cinematographer was Jack Cardiff. They had last worked together on Scott of the Antarctic in 1948.

Personal life and death

His first wife was the actress Aileen Raymond, who died only five days after he did. They were married in 1932 and divorced in 1941. Raymond later became the mother of actor Ian Ogilvy.

His second wife was the dramatist Mary Hayley Bell. Their marriage, on 16 January 1941, lasted for 64 years until his death in 2005. They were married in a rushed civil ceremony, because of the war; it was not until sixty years later that they were married in a church. They lived in The Wick, London, for many years. They sold the house to musician Ronnie Wood in 1971 and moved to Hills House, Denham, Buckinghamshire.

Mills and Bell had two daughters, Juliet, star of television's Nanny and the Professor and Hayley, a Disney child star who appeared in Pollyanna, The Parent Trap and Whistle Down the Wind, and one son, Jonathan Mills, a screenwriter. In 1947, Mills appeared with his daughters in the film So Well Remembered.  The three also appeared together decades later, on an episode of ABC's The Love Boat. Mills's grandson by Hayley, Crispian Mills, is a musician, best known for his work with the raga rock group Kula Shaker.

In the years leading up to John Mills' death, he appeared on television only on special occasions, his sight having failed almost completely by 1992. After that, his film roles were brief cameos. He wrote an autobiography entitled Up in the Clouds, Gentlemen Please, which was published in 1980 and revised in 2001.

Mills died on 23 April 2005 in Denham, Buckinghamshire, at the age of 97, following a stroke. Lady Mills died on 1 December 2005. They are buried in St Mary the Virgin Churchyard, Denham, Buckinghamshire.

Honours

Mills was appointed a Commander of the Order of the British Empire (CBE) in 1960. In 1976 he was knighted by the Queen.

In 1999, at 91 years of age, Mills became the oldest joining member of the entertainment charitable fraternity, the Grand Order of Water Rats.

In 2002, he received a Fellowship of the British Academy of Film and Television Arts (BAFTA), their highest award, and was named a Disney Legend by the Walt Disney Company.

Filmography

Film

Television

Stage appearances

Box office ranking
For a number of years, British film exhibitors voted him among the top ten British stars at the box office via an annual poll in the Motion Picture Herald''.
1945 – 4th
|*1946 – 8th
1947 – 4th (6th most popular overall)
1948 – 3rd (4th most popular over all)
1949 – 3rd (8th most popular over all)
1950 – 4th (6th most popular overall)
1954 – 10th
1955 – 2nd (5th most popular overall)
|*1956 – 10th
1957 – 6th
1958 – 6th
1961 – 5th

References

External links 

 
 It's Not Just Michael Powell: British Films of the 30s, 40s and 50s
 Sir John Mills Theatre – Eastern Angles
 planet625.com 
 Profile] at the Nigel Kneale & Quatermass Appreciation
 Photographs and literature
John Mills interview British Entertainment History Project
Sir John Mills at Find a Grave

1908 births
2005 deaths
Military personnel from Norfolk
Burials in Buckinghamshire
20th-century English male actors
20th-century English singers
Actors awarded knighthoods
BAFTA winners (people)
Best Supporting Actor Academy Award winners
Best Supporting Actor Golden Globe (film) winners
British Army personnel of World War II
British people of English descent
Commanders of the Order of the British Empire
Conservative Party (UK) people
English male film actors
English male musical theatre actors
English male stage actors
English male television actors
Infectious disease deaths in England
Knights Bachelor
Labour Party (UK) people
People educated at Norwich High School for Boys
People from Felixstowe
People from North Elmham
People from Suffolk (before 1974)
Royal Engineers officers
Volpi Cup for Best Actor winners